Never Let Go is a live album by the British progressive rock band Camel, released in 1993. It was recorded in Enschede, the Netherlands, 5 September 1992.

Track listing
Disc one
 "Never Let Go" (Latimer) – 7:22
 "Earthrise" (Bardens, Latimer) – 8:02
 "Rhayader" (Bardens, Latimer) – 2:23
 "Rhayader Goes to Town" (Bardens, Latimer) – 5:14
 "Spirit of the Water" (Bardens) – 3:03
 "Unevensong" (Bardens, Latimer, Ward) – 5:44
 "Echoes" (Bardens, Latimer, Ward) – 7:48
 "Ice" (Latimer) – 10:21
 "City Life" (Hoover, Latimer) – 5:10
 "Drafted" (Hoover, Latimer) – 4:12

Disc two
 "Dust Bowl" (Latimer) – 1:58
 "Go West" (Latimer) – 3:47
 "Dusted Out" (Latimer) – 1:36
 "Mother Road" (Hoover, Latimer) – 3:44
 "Needles" (Latimer) – 3:31
 "Rose of Sharon" (Hoover, Latimer) – 5:32
 "Milk 'n' Honey" (Latimer) – 3:28
 "End of the Line" (Hoover, Latimer) – 7:27
 "Storm Clouds" (Hoover, Latimer) – 3:16
 "Cotton Camp" (Latimer) – 2:28
 "Broken Banks" (Latimer) – 0:45
 "Sheet Rain" (Latimer) – 2:20
 "Whispers" (Latimer) – 1:06
 "Little Rivers and Little Rose" (Latimer) – 2:10
 "Hopeless Anger" (Latimer) – 4:54
 "Whispers in the Rain" (Latimer) – 3:56
 "Sasquatch" (Latimer) – 4:58
 "Lady Fantasy" (Camel) – 15:28

Personnel
Camel
 Andrew Latimer – guitars, flutes, keyboards, vocals
 Mickey Simmonds – keyboards
 Colin Bass – bass guitar, keyboards, vocals
 Paul Burgess – drums

References

External links
 
 
 Reviews of Camel albums at Starling.rinet.ru

1993 live albums
Camel (band) live albums
Self-released albums